Halder is a hamlet in the Dutch province of North Brabant. It is located in the municipality of Sint-Michielsgestel, between the towns of Sint-Michielsgestel and Vught.

The hamlet was first mentioned in 1087 as Herlar, and is a combination of "forest meadow" and "army". It takes its name from the castle. Halder has place name signs. It was home to 312 people in 1840.

Nieuw Herlaar Castle is a 19th century monastery, however it contains the 15th century tower of the old castle.

References

Populated places in North Brabant
Sint-Michielsgestel